The Dark Jewel Classic is a Scone Race Club Group 3 Thoroughbred quality handicap horse race for fillies and mares, over a distance of 1400 metres, held at Scone Racecourse in Scone, New South Wales, Australia in May.  Total prize money for the race is A$200,000.

History
The race is named after the mare Dark Jewel, who is considered one of the most prodigious post World War II Australian broodmares. She had eleven foals of which five were Group race winners (Baguette, Betelgeuse, Birthright, Cabochon and Heirloom).

The race is held in Scone, New South Wales located in the Hunter Valley which is world renowned for the horse breeding farms in the area. The 2020 event was held at Rosehill Racecourse due to the COVID-19 pandemic in Australia.

Grade
 1999–2013 - Listed Race
 2014 onwards - Group 3

Venue
 1999–2019 - Scone Racecourse
 2020 - Rosehill Racecourse

Winners

 2022 - Bring The Ransom
 2021 - Rocha Clock
 2020 - Irithea
 2019 - Con Te Partiro
 2018 - Siren's Fury
 2017 - Daysee Doom
 2016 - Danish Twist
 2015 - Divertire
2014 - Seaside
2013 - Arctic Flight
2012 - Upon This Rock
2011 - Shannara 
2010 - So Anyway 
2009 - Rio Osa 
2008 - Sung  
2007 - Rosa’s Spur   
2006 - Really Flying  
2005 - Kosta Nothin'  
2004 - Romare  
2003 - Chuckle    
2002 - Hot Riff      
2001 - Nanny Maroon  
2000 - Stella Marie  
1999 - Little Pattie   
1998 - Amber 
1997 - Timeless Winds
1996 - Tripping

See also
 List of Australian Group races
 Group races

References

Horse races in Australia
Sprint category horse races for fillies and mares